Anthony Bagaš also known as Arsenije Bagaš (fl. 1366 – 1385) was a Serbian nobleman from Kastoria who retreated to Mount Athos in between 1356 and 1366, where he later bought and restored the ruined Athonite monastery of Saint Paul (Agiou Pavlou) with the help of Nikola-Gerasim Radonja (the son of sebastokrator Branko Mladenović) in the 1380s, becoming its abbott - taking the monastic name Arsenios (Arsenije). The two were successful in receiving donations from both the Byzantines and Serbs, and refurbishing the monastery with revenue from Serbian silver and gold mines, making it one of the major Serbian monasteries. He translated hagiographical works into Serbian.

He had a brother, Nikola, who in 1385 donated the monastery of Mesonesiotissa near Edessa, together with villages, churches and other property to the Saint Paul monastery of Arsenije.  Some scholars believe that the Bagaš family was originally from Vranje in Serbia while some other scholars believe that historical sources do not confirm it.

See also
Teodosije the Hilandarian (1246-1328), one of the most important Serbian writers in the Middle Ages
Elder Grigorije (fl. 1310–1355), builder of Saint Archangels Monastery
Elder Siluan
Lazar the Hilandarian (fl. 1404), the first known Serbian and Russian watchmaker
Pachomius the Serb (fl. 1440s-1484), hagiographer of the Russian Church
 Miroslav Gospel
 Gabriel the Hilandarian
 Constantine of Kostenets
 Cyprian, Metropolitan of Kiev and All Rus'
 Gregory Tsamblak
 Isaija the Monk
 Grigorije of Gornjak
 Atanasije (scribe)
 Rajčin Sudić
 Nicodemus of Tismana
 Dimitar of Kratovo
 Marko Pećki

Notes

References

Sources

Jan Olof Rosenqvist, Interaction and isolation in late Byzantine culture, Google book
 
Angold, Eastern Christianity Michael Angold
Through the looking glass: Byzantium through British eyes : papers from the twenty-ninth Spring Symposium of Byzantine Studies, London, March 1995, p. 141

Further reading
Studi Slavistici : rivista dell'Associazione Italiana degli Slavisti - 2005 - 2 - Recensioni 

14th-century Serbian nobility
People of the Serbian Empire
Medieval Serbian Orthodox clergy
People from Kastoria
Antonije
People associated with Agiou Pavlou Monastery